Nidjat Mamedov (born 2 April 1985) is an Azerbaijani chess player. He was awarded the title Grandmaster by FIDE in 2006.

He won the U14 section of European Youth Chess Championships in 1999. In 2007 Mamedov tied for first place with Mircea Pârligras in the 11th Open International Bavarian Championship in Bad Wiessee winning the tournament on tiebreak. He tied for first with Vadim Malakhatko and Valeriy Neverov in the 2007/08 Hastings International Chess Congress. In 2008 he tied for 4–8th with Tamaz Gelashvili, Anton Filippov, Constantin Lupulescu and Alexander Zubarev in the Romgaz Open tournament in Bucharest. Mamedov won the Azerbaijani championship in 2011. In June 2013, he won the Teplice Open in Czech Republic.
 In 2018 Mamedov won the Nakhchivan Open, edging out Sergei Tiviakov on tiebreak score.

He played for Azerbaijan in the 2000 Chess Olympiad in Istanbul, Turkey and in the World Team Chess Championships of 2010 and 2013.

References

External links 
Nidjat Mamedov chess games at 365Chess.com

1985 births
Living people
Chess grandmasters
Azerbaijani chess players
Chess Olympiad competitors
People from Nakhchivan